Eloi Rodrigues Schleder (born July 26, 1951 in Passo Fundo\RS) is a former long-distance runner from Brazil, who represented his native country in the men's marathon at the 1984 Summer Olympics. There he finished in 23rd position, clocking 2:16:35.

Achievements
All results regarding marathon, unless stated otherwise

References

 
sports-reference

1951 births
Living people
Brazilian male long-distance runners
Athletes (track and field) at the 1979 Pan American Games
Athletes (track and field) at the 1984 Summer Olympics
Olympic athletes of Brazil
Brazilian people of German descent
Place of birth missing (living people)
Pan American Games athletes for Brazil